Âouinet Bel Egrâ (also known as Aouinet Bélagraa) is a village in the commune of Tindouf, in Tindouf Province, Algeria. It is in the Sahara Desert approximately 160 kilometres south-east of Tindouf. There is a Saharawi Refugee camp here named Dakhla.

References

Neighbouring towns and cities

Populated places in Tindouf Province